Schaereria brunnea is a species of lichen in the family Schaereriaceae, first found in inland rainforests of British Columbia.

References

Lecanoromycetes
Lichen species
Lichens of Western Canada
Lichens described in 2009
Fungi without expected TNC conservation status